Sakukan or Sekukan may refer to:
 Sakukan, Manujan
 Sekukan, Zarand